David Terrell may refer to:
David Terrell (wide receiver), former NFL wide receiver
David Terrell (safety), former NFL safety
David Terrell (fighter), mixed martial arts fighter